Andinomyia is a genus of bristle flies in the family Tachinidae. There are about five described species in Andinomyia.

Species
These five species belong to the genus Andinomyia:
 Andinomyia complanata (Vimmer & Soukup, 1940) c g
 Andinomyia cruciata Townsend, 1912 c g
 Andinomyia nigra Vimmer & Soukup, 1940 c g
 Andinomyia rufomaculata Vimmer & Soukup, 1940 c g
 Andinomyia townsendi (Vimmer & Soukup, 1940) c g
Data sources: i = ITIS, c = Catalogue of Life, g = GBIF, b = Bugguide.net

References

Further reading

External links

 
 

Tachinidae